The 1991 Virginia Slims of Oklahoma was a women's tennis tournament played on indoor hard courts at The Greens Country Club in Oklahoma City, Oklahoma in the United States that was part of Tier IV of the 1991 WTA Tour. It was the sixth edition of the tournament was held from February 18 through February 24, 1991. First-seeded Jana Novotná won the singles title and earned $27,000 first-prize money.

Finals

Singles
 Jana Novotná defeated  Anne Smith 3–6, 6–3, 6–2
 It was Novotná's 2nd singles title of the year and the 5th of her career.

Doubles
 Meredith McGrath /  Anne Smith defeated  Katrina Adams /  Jill Hetherington 6–2, 6–4

References

External links
 ITF tournament edition details
 Tournament draws

Virginia Slims of Oklahoma
U.S. National Indoor Championships
Virginia Slims of Oklahoma
Virginia Slims of Oklahoma
Virginia Slims of Oklahoma